Sundridge is a village in central Ontario, Canada, approximately 75 km south of North Bay, Ontario along Highway 11, on the shore of Lake Bernard. Sundridge is a tourist destination in both winter and summer, with boating and snowmobiling providing the main attraction. Algonquin Provincial Park is accessible nearby. Cities within a reasonable driving distance include Toronto (approximately 275 km south) and Ottawa (approximately 400 km east.)  The village has long been known as "The Pearl of the North" to residents of central and northern Ontario. The village is located in the Almaguin Highlands region of Parry Sound District.

History
Originally it was supposed to be named Sunny Ridge, but when the name was applied for in the late 1800s, an error at the post office department resulted in the name becoming Sundridge.

Sundridge developed largely as a result of the extension of the Canadian National Railway (CNR) northward. The first settler in the area – usually considered the village's founder – was James Dunbar in 1876. The CNR route in the area was completed in 1885, and the Village of Sundridge was incorporated in 1889. Protestant churches (Anglican, Methodist and Presbyterian) were established in the mid-1880s, and in 1897 the first municipal library was established. During World War I, Sundridge was the location for basic training for the 162nd Canadian Battalion.

The post office dates from 1879.

Demographics

Mother tongue:
 English as first language: 90.9%
 French as first language: 1.1%
 English and French as first language: 0%
 Other as first language: 8.0%

Notable people
 NHLers Bill McCreary Sr. and Greg de Vries.
 Canadian author Mary Susanne Edgar, founder of Glen Bernard Camp.
 NHLer Bucko McDonald, there is a street named after him.
 Donald Roy Beatty (c. 1930–2010), was a Canadian football player and won the Grey Cup with Hamilton (1953)

Local politics
The municipality is governed by a five-member council consisting of a mayor and four councillors, each elected at large every four years. Many local services (such as the library and arena) are run by committees jointly established by Sundridge and its surrounding townships. The current mayor of Sundridge is Lyle Hall.

References

External links

Municipalities in Parry Sound District
Single-tier municipalities in Ontario
Villages in Ontario